(born January 25, 1982) is a Japanese singer, songwriter, rapper, actor, news anchor, host and former radio host. He is a member of the boy band Arashi.

Sakurai began his career in the entertainment industry when he joined the Japanese talent agency Johnny & Associates in 1995 at the age of 13. About seven years after his debut as a singer with Arashi in 1999, he became a newscaster in 2006, appearing in the news program News Zero every Monday. In 2008, he was appointed the official newscaster for the news coverage of the Olympic Games in Beijing on NTV. For his work as an actor, singer and newscaster, Sakurai became one of the recipients of GQ Japan's Men of the Year award in 2009. His father is Shun Sakurai, former vice-minister of the Ministry of Internal Affairs and Communications.

Early life 
Sakurai was born in Maebashi, Gunma Prefecture, and grew up in Minato, Tokyo, the oldest of three children. His father, is a former government official who served as Vice Minister of Internal Affairs and Communications, and Vice President of Dentsu Group. Sakurai has a younger sister,  (b. 1986), who is a journalist for Nippon TV, and a younger brother,  (b. 1994).

Sakurai attended Keio Yochisha Elementary School, an affiliated elementary school of Keio University. From age three to ten, he did many extracurricular activities, including kendo, swimming, football, oil painting, calligraphy, and scouting. He began music lessons in early childhood, starting with the electric organ at age three and switching to piano in fourth grade. From fourth grade to sixth grade, he played trombone for his school's brass band. He also played trumpet and attended cram school. He joined a local football club after developing a strong interest in football during the J.League boom in 1993. He wanted to play for a professional team and at one point considered studying abroad in Brazil to become a professional footballer. He played football until his second year of junior high school.

In 1995, when Sakurai was thirteen years old, he sent an application to the talent agency, Johnny & Associates, and started activities as a Johnny's Jr. Despite already having an established career with Arashi by the time he graduated from high school, Sakurai went on to attend Keio University, graduating with a Bachelor of Economics in March 2004.

Music career 

Sakurai is the designated rapper of Arashi and, although he had written rap lyrics (known to fans as Sakurap) for some of the group's earlier releases under the pen name "Show", his first major contribution was for the A-side song "Kotoba Yori Taisetsu na Mono". While not the first artist from Johnny's to take on rapping, his breakthrough made it easier for his juniors to rap as well, despite being idols. According to Taichi Kokubun of Tokio, ex-KAT-TUN member  began to rap because of him.

He became the first member in Arashi to hold a solo concert called The Show in 2006. Sakurai was also a part of a special group with his Kisarazu Cat's Eye World Series co-stars that same year. Specially formed to promote the movie, they released the movie's theme song  as a single on October 25, 2006.

Sakurai co-wrote the lyrics of six songs on the August 2010 Arashi album Boku no Miteiru Fūkei. These songs are "Movin' On," "Mada Ue o", "Taboo" (Sho Sakurai solo), "Let Me Down," "Sora Takaku", and "Summer Splash!".

Acting career

Drama 
Unlike the other members, who made their major acting debut on stage, Sakurai made his debut on television in Arashi's volleyball-centered short drama  in 1999. With bandmate Kazunari Ninomiya, he co-starred in the manga-based comedy drama Yamada Tarō Monogatari in 2007. Sakurai had a small guest appearance on the final episode of the drama My Girl in 2009, which was bandmate Masaki Aiba's first starring role in a serial drama. That year, he also had a brief appearance on bandmate Satoshi Ohno's comedy drama series Uta no oniisan, as himself. On January 9, 2010, Sakurai co-starred with the other members of Arashi in the human suspense drama special Saigo no Yakusoku.

In 2001, he took part in his first drama series called  with Masahiro Matsuoka as his teacher. His role as a student with two conflicting characters won him Best Newcomer in the 5th Nikkan Sports Drama Grand Prix Awards.

In 2003, Sakurai was given his first lead role in the drama . He portrayed , a man who strives to prove himself capable of being a nursery school teacher. After Yoiko no Mikata, Sakurai took up many drama specials and mini-dramas until 2005. He even acted in a NHK late-night drama series called Tokio, in which each episode lasted for fifteen minutes each.

Although there was no release of dramas, movies or stageplays from Sakurai in 2008 due to his involvement with the Olympic Games in Beijing and Arashi's concert tours, 2009 saw his first lead role in a drama series since Yoiko no Mikata in 2003.

In 2009, in the drama The Quiz Show 2 with You Yokoyama, he portrayed an amnesic host of a live TV quiz program. He portrayed , a 28-year-old life insurance salesman who is caught up in a building hijack. Sakurai appeared in the docudrama special  on January 16, 2010. He portrayed , a real photo reporter who worked for the Kobe Shimbun and helped keep the newspaper running without interruption despite the damage inflicted from the Kobe earthquake.

On January 17, 2010, TBS aired the first episode of Sakurai and Maki Horikita's comedy drama .

On August 18, 2011, it was announced that Sakurai would be starring in a Fuji TV drama in the Fall season. The drama  is based on a bestselling novel published in 2010 by author Higashigawa Tokuya. Sakurai co-starred with actress Keiko Kitagawa. The drama aired starting in October. On January 26, 2012, it was announced that Fuji TV would produce a drama special for Nazotoki... to be aired on March 27. Sakurai played the lead role of Kageyama again, while Kitagawa reprised her role of Reiko Hosho. The drama special was filmed at Okinawa. A second special and a movie were released in August 2013

On January 25, 2012, TBS announced a three-night drama special Blackboard – Teachers Waging The Battles of Their Times, which aired in early April. Sakurai starred on the first night as a junior high school teacher who lost his right arm by war and struggled the change of moral after the war. His co-star was Yuko Oshima of AKB48.

In January 2023, Sakurai appears in his 5th drama with NTV, after Yoiko no Mikata (2003), The Quiz Show 2 (2009), Saki ni Umareta Dake no Boku (2017) and Nemesis (2021). Dai byōin senkyo is about a hospital suddenly occupied by an armed group wearing demon masks. Sakurai plays a detective, currently on leave of absence, who confronts the criminals, in the action-packed suspense drama.

Film 
In 2002, Sakurai made his motion picture debut in Arashi's first movie together, . He portrayed Chu, a yankee who dropped out of high school after an incident involving his teacher and the girl he had a crush on. In 2004, he reprised his role for the sequel of Pikanchi Life Is Hard Dakedo Happy, . In 2007, all the members of Arashi co-starred in their third movie together, with Sakurai playing the role of an aspiring writer. In 2014, in a third installment of the Pikanchi movies, called , Sakurai reprises his role, now as an adult Chu, who has settled down and started a family.

In 2002, in the drama Kisarazu Cat's Eye, he took on the role of Bambi, a college student who becomes part of a burglar ring at the beckoning of his cancer-stricken friend Bussan (played by Junichi Okada) to make his final days worthwhile. The drama would eventually span into two movie sequels entitled Kisarazu Cat's Eye: Nihon Series and Kisarazu Cat's Eye: World Series in 2003 and 2006 respectively.

While training for a rowing competition with the rest of Arashi on their variety show Mago Mago Arashi in 2005, Sakurai filmed his first starring movie role in the manga-based live-action film Honey and Clover. He portrayed the mellow .

By the end of 2007, it was announced that he would star as Gan-chan in the Takashi Miike movie Yatterman, which was not released in theaters until the beginning of 2009.

It was announced on June 8, 2010 that Sakurai would co-star with Aoi Miyazaki in the novel-based movie , released in theaters in 2011. It would be the first time Sakurai portrayed a doctor. A sequel for the movie,  hit theaters in 2014. In the first movie, Dr. Ichito Kurihara (Sakurai) was struggling with work life in a countryside hospital on the alert 365 days a year. In the sequel, his struggles between family life and work life are accentuated when Ichito's friend from college, also a physician, Tatsuya Shindo (portrayed by Tatsuya Fujiwara), comes to Ichito's hospital from Tokyo.

On June 4, 2012 the movie version of the popular drama  was announced. Sakurai once again portrayed the sharp-tongued mysteries-solving butler Kageyama, co-starring with Kitagawa Keiko. The plot of the movie is a murder case that happens on a luxurious cruise ship. Besides set filming, the production team also filmed overseas in Singapore where they boarded the luxurious cruise ship SuperStar Virgo for onsite filming. The movie completed filming by end of July 2012 and is scheduled for release on August 3, 2013 in Japan.  The International Gala Premiere was held in Singapore on July 27, 2013 at Marina Bay Sands, where about 2,000 fans from Singapore, Thailand and other countries in the region were treated to face-to-face interactions with the main cast of Sakurai and his fellow cast members, Keiko Kitagawa and Shinai Kippei.  Director Masato Hijikata also graced the occasion. Selected fans got to watch the movie premiere with the cast and director in the Sands Theatre, and were treated to a 20-minute Q&A session with the actors and director after the movie screening.  The Singapore premiere of the movie was scheduled for August 22, 2013, with a special Fans' Screening by Golden Village cinemas on August 14, 2013.

Other ventures

Radio 
From October 5, 2002 to March 30, 2008, Sakurai hosted his own radio show called Sho Beat on FM Fuji.

Commercials 

 Able Inc.  real estate company (2008-2011)
 Aflac Japan (2011- )
 Ajinomoto Frozen Foods (2011- )
 Asahi Group Holdings, Ltd.
 Asahi Soft Drinks "Mitsuya Cider" (2009-2010, 2020-) In 2020, with Arashi as a group, including a video of himself with audio from Satoshi Ohno. In 2021-2023, together with fellow Arashi member Masaki Aiba, and including Hey! Say! JUMP member Ryosuke Yamada, and Snow Man members Ryohei Abe and Ren Meguro  in a series of commercials for Spring and Summer.
 Asahi Breweries "New Clear Asahi" beer (2019)
 Benesse Corporation Shinkenzemi Junior High School Seminar  (2011-2013)
 Japanese Cabinet Office 2050 Low-carbon economy (2008)
 House Foods Vermont Curry (2023- )
 House Wellness Foods Co., Ltd. "C1000" (beverage) (2006-2007)
 Japan Airlines (2021-) With fellow Arashi member Jun Matsumoto
 Japan Post Co., Ltd. New Year's postcard campaign (2008 - 2009), also with Arashi (2019)
 JINS Co., Ltd.  chain stores and shopping centers (2012-2014)
 Johnan Academic Preparatory Institute (2005)
 JustSystems Smile Seminar (2021-)
 Kao Corporation 
 "Essential" hair product   (2014-2016, 2019-)
 "MegRhythm" heat patches and eye masks (2016- )
 Lawson Inc. (2014-2015)
 Menicon Lactive contact lenses (2022-)
 Mitsui Fudosan real estate (2018- )
 Morinaga & Company 
 Morinaga Confectionaries and Health Foods Industry
 "in" (formerly Weider's in) jelly drink  (2015- )
 Morinaga Cocoa (2017-)
 Morinaga Milk Industry "pino" brand ice cream (2010-2016)
 Otsuka Pharmaceutical "Oronamin C" drink (2011-2015)
 Shiseido's "Uno" brand "W Design Fiber" hair product x Kisarazu Cat's Eye collaboration (2006)
 Taisho Pharmaceutical "Claritin EX" (2020- )
 Toyota Financial Services Financing Plan  (2007)

Variety TV Show 
Sakurai hosts, starting in January 2021, a new variety program, substituting Arashi's signature program Arashi ni Shiyagare, ended in December 2020.
 TBS Ima, ko no kao ga sugoi ! (今、この顔がスゴい!) – MC (4/11/2013 – March 20, 2014)
 TBS Sakurai Ariyoshi The Dangerous Night (櫻井有吉アブナイ夜会) – Sakurai Ariyoshi The Night (櫻井・有吉 THE夜会) – MC (4/17/2014–present)
 NTV 1 oku 3000 man nin no shō channeru (1億3000万人のSHOWチャンネル) – MC (January, 2021-present)

Newscasts, documentary and informative series 
In 2006, he became a newscaster for the NTV news program News Zero with newscaster  and actress Mao Kobayashi. He continues co-hosting Monday's edition, now with main newscaster Yumiko Udo

On June 7, 2009, Sakurai was one of the main newscasters for a special program titled Touch! Eco 2009, which focused on environmental issues.

In 2007, he was chosen to help host , a special program which focused the 2007 House of Councillors elections. Sakurai became the first pop idol to host such a program. He has continued to co-host the special program until the 2022 elections.

In 2007, he was chosen as the main caster for Fuji TV's broadcast of the 2007 Volleyball World Cup, marking it the first time in eight years that he has been involved with the Volleyball World Cup. In 2008, Sakurai was a newscaster for the 2008 FIVB Women's World Olympic Qualification Tournament and the main newscaster for the news coverage of the Olympic Games in Beijing on NTV. Sakurai was the special newscaster for the 2010 Winter Olympics news coverage on NTV with Shizuka Arakawa as the main newscaster. On May 13, 2012, NTV announced the appointment of Sakurai as the main caster for their coverage of the 2012 London Summer Olympics, which runs from July 27 to August 12, 2012. It is Sakurai's third consecutive Olympic main caster appointment for NTV after 2008 Beijing and 2010 Vancouver. He was chosen, alongside his Arashi co-member Masaki Aiba, to host the NHK special program coverage for the Tokyo Olympics and Paralympics, celebrated from July 23, 2021.

In July 2010, Sakurai traveled to Romania, Germany, and Russia to do a special report on world poverty for 24-Hour Television, which was broadcast on August 29, 2010. He interviewed former Soviet Union General Secretary and Nobel Peace Prize winner Mikhail Gorbachev about nuclear disarmament and poverty.

Sakurai was chosen by Nippon Television Network (NTV) of Japan as the main MC of their royal wedding special, "British Royal Family Prince William and Princess Kate". The special was aired on April 29, 2011, featuring video footage from the British Broadcasting Channel that covered the joyous occasion for the British royal family.

Sakurai co-hosted the special program 復興テレビ_みんなのチカラ aired on March 11, 2012, a special program to remember the 9.0 magnitude earthquake that hit North-eastern Japan in 2011.

On August 4, 2015 Sakurai and Akira Ikegami hosted the first episode of an NTV series called  . This first installment dealt with a look at the war 70 years after Japan's surrender, and the Japanese peoples understanding of it. A second episode aired on March 1, 2016. This one dealt with a historical look of the Great Eastern Japan Earthquake 5 years after, primarily, and other disasters around the world such as eruptions, landslides, floods and typhoons, and how to deal with them and prepare in order to save lives. A new episode aired two years later, February 6, 2018. On this one, Sakurai and Ikegami talked about "Unexpected Japan", dealing with politics and its relationship to the Olympic Games, North Korea and the Imperial Family. A fourth installment of the series aired on May 4, 2020, where they talked about the "ultra difficult problems" facing Japan, like the coronavirus and all that happened around the pandemic, such as the closing of schools, delays in services and postponement of big events, like the Tokyo Olympics and Paralympics. On May 31, 2021, a 5th installment of the program aired. With the theme "clear and present danger", Ikegami and Sakurai, together with guests, talked about the ongoing investigation on coronavirus, its sequelae and the fight against it and new viruses. It also included a talk about new AI technology and the risk of it being misused and abused, like in drones, which could be used as weapons, and the so called "Deepfake", in which false images are used to replace someone else in order to commit crimes, like fraud.

On December 10, 2022, an NHK documentary called Design Museum Japan, hosted by Sakurai, takes a look at "design treasures" from regions all over Japan.

Music Event 
 Nippon TV Best Artist (日テレ系音楽の祭典 ベストアーティスト) Main Host (2009–2022)
 Nippon TV Music Festival – The Power of Music (日テレ系音楽の祭典 音楽のちから2012) Main Host (2012) 
 Nippon TV The Music Day Main Host (2013–2022)
 NHK Kōhaku Uta Gassen White team host (solo, 2018, 2019; as part of Arashi, 2010 – 2014), special navigator (2022)

Telethon
Sakurai appears as main personality in NTV's 24-Hr TV for 6th time, 5 with Arashi (2004, 2008, 2012, 2013, 2019) (24時間テレビ) and 1 by himself (2017)

Personal exhibition
"Sho Sakurai: Words for the Future", is Sakurai's first exhibition centered in his words, both as part of Arashi and as an individual, thought of since 2018, to convey his feelings and words expressed in different ways, like in the reinterpretation of his "Sakurap" and words shared in various media (like narrated excepts from the 2019 Newsweek Japan special feature "Sho Sakurai and the Memory of War"). It will be held from April 14 to May 5, 2023, at the Roppongi Museum in Tokyo.

Personal life 
On September 28, 2021, Sakurai announced his marriage through a letter he released in their fan club website.
Sakurai announced the birth of their first child on February 15, 2023 through official site. Date of birth and child's gender were not revealed.

Contributions

Rap lyrics

Filmography

Television

Film

Theatre

Awards and nominations

Footnotes

References

External links 
J Storm Profile
Sho Sakurai | Johnny's Net Profile
 
 

1982 births
Living people
Arashi members
Japanese male pop singers
Japanese rappers
Keio University alumni
Japanese male film actors
Japanese male stage actors
Japanese male television actors
Japanese male idols
Singers from Tokyo
20th-century Japanese male actors
21st-century Japanese male actors